Taihei-ji (太平寺) is a Buddhist temple in Osaka Prefecture, Japan. It was founded in about 1555, and it is affiliated with Sōtō Buddhism.

See also 
Thirteen Buddhist Sites of Osaka

Buddhist temples in Osaka